"Nuestra Canción" (English: "Our Song") is a single by Colombian band Monsieur Periné featuring Vicente García, from the studio album Caja de Música (2015). In October 2021, the song gained popularity due to its use in an edit of Bugs Bunny dressed as woman which led to its widespread use on the video-sharing app TikTok, receiving over 12 million views for the month.

Background
Despite being released in April 2015, the song became a sleeper hit and gained popularity in October 2021 due to widespread use on the app TikTok.

Music video
The music video was released on April 7, 2016 on YouTube. It was filmed near the Neusa reservoir in the Cundinamarca region of Colombia, and was directed by Christian Schmid Rincon. The video depicts a flower festival.

Charts

Certifications

References

2015 songs
Viral videos